Mickens may refer to:
 Mickens House, a historic home in West Palm Beach, Florida, United States

People with the surname Mickens
Arnold Mickens (1972-2022), American football player
Carl L. Mickens (born 1960), American politician
Glenn Mickens (born 1930), American baseball pitcher
James Mickens, American computer scientist
Jaydon Mickens (born 1994), American football wide receiver
Mike Mickens (born 1987), American football cornerback
Ray Mickens (born 1973), German-American football cornerback
Ronald E. Mickens (born 1943), American physicist
Terry Mickens (born 1971), American wide receiver
Tommy Mickens, fictional character in True Blood